Union Township is a now dissolved township which existed from 1831 to 1868 and was located in present-day Camden County, New Jersey.

Union Township was formed by an Act of the New Jersey Legislature on November 15, 1831, while the area was still part of Gloucester County, taking territory from Gloucester Township and incorporating all of Gloucestertown Township.

When Camden County was separated from Gloucester County on March 13, 1844, Union Township was one of the original Camden County municipalities. On March 6, 1855, a new township, Centre Township, was formed from Union Township's territory. On February 25, 1868, the township was dissolved and the remaining land was chartered as Gloucester City.

Current municipalities within the bounds of Union Township
 Barrington Borough
 Bellmawr Borough
 Brooklawn Borough
 Gloucester City
 Haddon Heights Borough
 Lawnside Borough
 Magnolia Borough
 Mount Ephraim Borough
 Runnemede Borough
 Tavistock Borough

See also
 List of historical Camden County, New Jersey municipalities

References

1831 establishments in New Jersey
1868 disestablishments in New Jersey
Geography of Camden County, New Jersey
Former townships in New Jersey
Populated places disestablished in 1868
Populated places established in 1831